is a Japanese professional baseball pitcher for the Fukuoka SoftBank Hawks in Japan's Nippon Professional Baseball.

Early career
Takahashi participated in the 3rd grade spring 87th Japanese High School Baseball Invitational Tournament and the 3rd grade summer 97th Japanese High School Baseball Championship as an ace pitcher at Gifu Prefectural Gifu Commercial High School.

He was selected as the Japan national baseball team in the 2015 U-18 Baseball World Cup.

Professional career

Fukuoka SoftBank Hawks

In the 2015 NPB draft, he was selected as the first pick for the Fukuoka SoftBank Hawks, Chunichi Dragons and Hokkaido Nippon-Ham Fighters where he was won in a lottery by the Hawks.

2016–2020 season
On 7 June 2016, Takahashi made his debut for the Hawks Western League team against the Dragons as a relief pitcher claiming the win after pitching 3 scoreless innings and claiming 3 strikeouts. He was selected for the Western League representative team for the 2016 Fresh All-Stars game in Okayama. He was the starting pitcher and threw 1 strikeout and gave up one hit in his single inning.

On April 14, 2017, Takahashi debuted in the Pacific League against the Orix Buffaloes as a relief pitcher. In 2017 season, he pitched only one game in the Pacific League.

In 2018 season, he didn't have a chance to pitch in the Pacific League and pitched in the Western League.

Takahashi finished 2019 season with a record of 3-2 with 42 starts as a Relief pitcher, with a 2.56 ERA,  and a 17 Holds and a 58 strikeouts in 51 innings. In the 2019 Japan Series against the Yomiuri Giants, he relief pitched in Game 2.

In 2020 season, Takahashi left the team in March with a pain in his right shoulder. He pitched in the Western League on September 1, but never had a chance to pitch in the Pacific League.

2021 season–present
On April 23, 2021, Takahashi rwon the match against Chiba Lotte Marines for the first time in two years. He recorded a 1–1 Win–loss record, a 2 holds, and an ERA of 0.00 in 10 pitches, but ended the season with a broken right hand on May 7.

In 2022 season, he didn't have a chance to pitch in the first league, partly because he injured his adductor muscle in spring training and was late to the game.

References

External links

Career statistics - NPB.jp
 47 Jumpei Takahashi PLAYERS2022 - Fukuoka SoftBank Hawks Official site

1997 births
Living people
Baseball people from Gifu Prefecture
Japanese expatriate baseball players in Puerto Rico
Nippon Professional Baseball pitchers
Fukuoka SoftBank Hawks players
Gigantes de Carolina players